Rhene facilis is  a species of jumping spider in the genus Rhene. The spider, spotted in South Africa and Tanzania, is small with distinctive female and male forms. The female is light brown, with grey and red hints, and has a distinctive epigyne. The male is darker in colour, with an almost black carapace and a dark brown abdomen with a white patterns, and has a slightly curved embolus. The male was first described in 2000 and the female in 2013.

Taxonomy
Rhene facilis is a member of the genus Rhene, which is named after the Greek female name, shared by mythological figures. The species name, facilis, means easy. The male was first described in 2000 by Wanda Wesołowska and Anthony Russell-Smith and the female by Wesołowska and Charles Haddad in 2013.

Description
Rhene facilis is a small spider, typical of the genus. The male is distinguished from other Rhene spiders by the distinctive white pattern, a combination of white hairy patches and a fine white stripe, on the abdomen, and a fine, slightly curved embolus.

The spider is generally lighter in colour. The carapace is reddish-brown and the abdomen greyish-brown and more elongated than the male.

Distribution
Rhene facilis has been found in South Africa and Tanzania.

References

Salticidae
Fauna of Tanzania
Spiders of Africa
Spiders of South Africa
Spiders described in 2000